Lionel Richie is the debut solo studio album by American singer Lionel Richie, released on October 6, 1982, on Motown Records. Originally intended as a side project at the suggestion of Motown, it was recorded and released while Richie was still a member of the Commodores; he left the group shortly after the album's release. The first single from the album, "Truly", topped the Billboard Hot 100. Follow-up single "You Are" reached number four, and "My Love" reached number five. The album reached number one on the Cashbox albums chart on December 11, 1982.

In 2003, Lionel Richie was re-released as part of a remaster series that saw two additional tracks added: a solo version of "Endless Love" and an instrumental version of "You Are".
Eagles member Joe Walsh provided the guitar solo for the song "Wandering Stranger".

Track listing

Personnel 

Musicians

 Lionel Richie – lead vocals, vocal arrangements, backing vocals (1, 2, 3, 5-8), acoustic piano (4, 6, 8), Fender Rhodes (7), rhythm arrangements (7)
 Greg Phillinganes – Fender Rhodes (1), Roland Jupiter 8 (1), Minimoog (1), arrangements (1)
 Clarence McDonald – Fender Rhodes (2)
 Michael Lang – acoustic piano (2, 9), Fender Rhodes (9)
 David Cochrane – Prophet-5 (3), electric guitar (3, 7), synthesizer bass (3, 7), backing vocals (3, 7), arrangements (3, 5), acoustic piano (5), bass guitar (5), saxophone solo (5)
 Michael Boddicker – synthesizers (3, 5, 7), vocoder (3, 5, 7)
 Bill Payne – Fender Rhodes (6)
 Thomas Dolby [uncredited] – synthesizer programming (7), backing vocals (7)
 Paul Jackson Jr. – electric guitar (1, 2, 6)
 Fred Tackett – acoustic guitar (2)
 Joe Walsh – guitar solo (2)
 Richie Zito – guitar solo (3)
 Darrell Jones – electric guitar (4, 5, 7), acoustic guitar (8)
 Tim May – acoustic guitar (6)
 Nathan Watts – bass guitar (1)
 Joe Chemay – bass guitar (2, 6, 8)
 Nathan East – bass guitar (4)
 John Robinson – drums (1, 5, 7)
 Leon "Ndugu" Chancler – drums (2, 4)
 Paul Leim – drums (3, 6, 8)
 Lenny Castro – percussion (1)
 Paulinho da Costa – percussion (2, 5, 7)
 Rick Shlosser – percussion (5)
 Gene Page – arrangements (2, 6, 9)
 Harry Bluestone – concertmaster (2-9)
 James Anthony Carmichael – arrangements (3, 4, 5, 8), string arrangements (3, 7), horn arrangements (7), rhythm arrangements (7), celeste (8)
 Howard Kenney – backing vocals (1, 5, 7)
 Richard Marx – backing vocals (1, 2, 7, 8)
 Deborah Thomas – backing vocals (2, 3, 5, 7)
 Jimmy Connors – backing vocals (3)
 Kenny Rogers – backing vocals (4), BGV arrangement (4)
 Kin Vassy – backing vocals (4)
 Terry Williams – backing vocals (4)

Horns, strings and woodwinds

 Louise Di Tullo – flute (3, 6, 9)
 Art Maebe – French horn (3, 4, 6, 8, 9)
 Richard Perissi – French horn (3, 6, 9)
 Henry Sigismonti – French horn (3, 6, 9)
 Jim Atkinson – French horn (4, 8)
 David Duke – French horn (4, 8)
 Brian O'Connor – French horn (4, 8)
 William Green – saxophone (5, 7)
 Ernie Watts – saxophone (5, 7)
 Lew McCreary – trombone (4, 5, 7, 8)
 Bill Reichenbach, Jr. – trombone (4, 5, 7, 8)
 Gary Grant – trumpet (4, 5, 7, 8)
 Jerry Hey – trumpet  (4, 5, 7, 8)
 Walter Johnson – trumpet (4, 5, 7, 8)
 Warren Luening – trumpet (4, 5, 7, 8)
 Bob Findley – trumpet (5, 7)
 Don Ashworth – woodwinds (4, 8)
 Gene Cipriano – woodwinds (4, 8)
 Gary Herbig – woodwinds (4, 8), saxophone (5, 7)
 Larry Williams – woodwinds (4, 8)
 Jesse Ehrlich – cello (2, 3, 6, 9)
 Armand Kaproff – cello (2, 3, 6, 9)
 Paula Hochhalter – cello (2, 6, 9)
 Dennis Karmazyn – cello (2, 6, 9)
 Arni Egilsson – double bass (2, 6, 9)
 Buell Neidlinger – double bass (2, 6, 9)
 Ray Brown – double bass (4, 5, 7, 8)
 Morty Corb – double bass (4, 5, 7, 8)
 Gayle Levant – harp (2, 4-9)
 Alan DeVeritch – viola (2, 3, 6, 9)
 Allan Harshman – viola (2, 3, 6, 9)
 Virginia Majewski – viola (2, 3, 6, 9)
 Gareth Nuttycombe – viola (2, 3, 6, 9)
 Bonnie Douglas – violin (2, 3, 6, 9)
 Assa Drori – violin (2, 3, 6, 9)
 Endre Granat – violin (2, 3, 6, 9)
 Joy Lyle – violin (2, 3, 6, 9)
 Donald Palmer – violin (2, 3, 6, 9)
 Henry Roth – violin (2, 3, 6, 9)
 Sheldon Sanov – violin (2, 3, 6, 9)
 Jack Shulman – violin (2, 3, 6, 9)
 Paul Shure – violin (2, 3, 6, 9)
 Mari Tsumura-Botnick – violin (2, 3, 6, 9), strings (4, 5, 7, 8)
 Charles Veal, Jr. – violin (2, 3, 6, 9)
 Rollice Dale – strings (4, 5, 7, 8)
 Henry Ferber – strings (4, 5, 7, 8)
 Ronald Folsom – strings (4, 5, 7, 8)
 William Henderson – strings (4, 5, 7, 8)
 William Kurasch – strings (4, 5, 7, 8)
 Erno Neufeld – strings (4, 5, 7, 8)
 Nathan Ross - strings (4, 5, 7, 8)
 Myron Sandler – strings (4, 5, 7, 8)
 David Schwartz – strings (4, 5, 7, 8)
 Fred Seykora – strings (4, 5, 7, 8)
 David Speltz – strings (4, 5, 7, 8)
 Tibor Zelig – strings (4, 5, 7, 8)

Production 
 Producers – James Anthony Carmichael and Lionel Richie
 Production Assistant – Brenda Harvey-Richie
 Recorded and Mixed by Calvin Harris
 Second Recording Engineer – Jim Cassell
 Second Mix Engineers – Michael Johnson, Fred Law and Stephan Smith.
 Additional Mixing – Jane Clark
 Mastered by Bernie Grundman at A&M Studios (Los Angeles, CA).
 Creative Assistant – Rita Leigh
 Art Direction – Johnny Lee
 Photography – David Alexander

Charts

Weekly charts

Year-end charts

Certifications and sales

References

1982 debut albums
Lionel Richie albums
Motown albums
Albums produced by James Anthony Carmichael
Albums produced by Lionel Richie
Albums recorded at A&M Studios